Giovanni Battista di Quadro (Polish Jan Baptysta Quadro, Latin Joannes Baptista Quadro) (died between 10 April 1590 and 16 January 1591) was an Italian renaissance architect, one of the most famous architects in Central Europe in his era.

Biography
He was born Ponte Tresa or Cadro, near Lugano (today Switzerland).

Until 1550, he probably worked in Saxony and Silesia, but on 13 March 1550, he signed a contract with the city council of Poznań for rebuilding the town hall. In 1551, with the agreement of the council, he went to Płock as a consultant on the renovation of the cathedral. In the same year, his name was mentioned in the court books of Poznań because of links between him and the Bishop of Poznań Benedykt Izdebski relating to building the bishop's palace in Krobia. From 1552 to 1562, di Quadro was the City Architect of Poznań, but the City Council also paid him in 1563, 1566, 1567, and 1570 for minor works. During these years, he worked for the citizens of Poznań and the clergy and nobles of Greater Poland.

From 1568 to 1572, he worked in Warsaw, rebuilding today's Royal Castle.

His many well-paid jobs made him wealthy. However, after he retired in 1573, he died as an indebted person in Poznań.

During the years 1550-1552, his brothers Antoni, Gabriel, and Kilian di Quadro also worked in Poznań.

Works

Existing
Poznań City Hall (reinessance rebuild in 1550 -1560)
tomb of Bishop Adam Konarski in Poznań cathedral
Building of Scale in Poznań (renaissance rebuild in 1563 and renovation in 1573. In 1890 Scale was demolished, but after World War II it was rebuilt on di Quadro's original plans.)

Disappeared
private houses in Poznań
Stary Rynek 84 (after 1554)
Ślusarska Str. (1559)
Stary Rynek 39 (1561)
Stary Rynek 81 (1563)
Stary Rynek 52 (before 1579)
Plac Kolegiacki (since 1568, not finished. Renovated, probably based on his project in years 1958-1960)
Royal Castle in Warsaw (1568–1572) (reproductions of his original work is visible)
House of priests of St. Stanislaus in Poznań (Za Bramką Str., 1571 - 1574)
minor works in Poznań cathedral

Probable
Works (existing and no longer existing) attributable to him, on analysis of style and unverified documents):
Chapel of Kościeleccy family in Kościelec near Inowrocław (about 1559)
private house on Wrocławska Str. 11 in Poznań
gate and tower of bridge in Łacina (today Poznań) (1560)
renovation of tower of not existing Poznań Collegiate church
Jesuits College in Poznań (1572)
Shearing hall w Poznaniu
Cloth hall in Poznań
Trade hall w Poznaniu (1563)

References
Common work, Wielkopolski Słownik Biograficzny, PWN, Warsaw-Poznań 1983, 

1590s deaths
16th-century Italian architects
Italian Renaissance architects
Italy–Poland relations
Italian emigrants to Poland
Architects from Ticino
Year of birth unknown